Jasmin Gerat (born 25 December 1978, West Berlin, Germany) is a German actress.

Gerat is the daughter of a Turkish father and a German mother. In 1994 she won the Bravo-Girl competition. The next year, she placed second in The Look of the Year competition for models. In the mid-nineties, she began working in German television, hosting Heart Attack, Bravo TV and Chartbreaker.

Gerat began working as an actress in 1997, her first major role being a lead in Caipiranha by Felix Dünnemann.  In addition to film and television roles, Gerat has performed on stage, in Düsseldorf and Hanover.

Beginning in 2005, she has played the police detective Jale Beck on the crime series Cologne P.D., a role she helped develop. Beck is, like Gerat, half-Turkish, half-German.

Filmography
 First Love – Die große Liebe (1997)
 SK-Babies – Partyline (1998)
 Küstenwache (2000–2005)
 I Love You, Baby (2000)
 Marokko und der beste Mensch der Welt (2001)
 SK Kölsch – Die letzte Runde (2002)
 Der Bulle von Tölz – Strahlende Schönheit (2003)
 Cologne P.D. (2003)
 Zwischen Liebe und Tod (2004)
  –  (2004)
 Mädchen, Mädchen 2 – Loft oder Liebe (Girls on Top 2) (2004)
 Die Mandantin (2005)
 Alarm für Cobra 11 – Lauras Entscheidung (2006)
 Mord auf Rezept (2006)
 Rabbit Without Ears 2 (2009)
 Kokowääh (2011)
 Men Do What They Can (2012)
 Kokowääh 2 (2013)
 Nicht mein Tag (2014)
 The Team (2015)
 Die letzte Spur (2016)

References

External links
 

German people of Turkish descent
Living people
1978 births
German television actresses
Actresses from Berlin
German television personalities
German film actresses
21st-century German actresses